The Spearhead is a  peak in the Garibaldi Ranges of British Columbia, Canada, and is one of the main summits of the Blackcomb Mountain portion of the Whistler Blackcomb ski resort, located at the apex of the Blackcomb and Spearhead Glaciers, which is named for it.  It also is the namesake of the Spearhead Range, which is the short range flanking the north side of Fitzsimmons Creek and ending on its northwest end at Blackcomb Mountain. The mountain's name was officially adopted on August 27, 1965, by the Geographical Names Board of Canada.

Climate

Based on the Köppen climate classification, The Spearhead is located in the marine west coast climate zone of western North America.  Most weather fronts originate in the Pacific Ocean, and travel east toward the Coast Mountains where they are forced upward by the range (Orographic lift), causing them to drop their moisture in the form of rain or snowfall. As a result, the Coast Mountains experience high precipitation, especially during the winter months in the form of snowfall. Temperatures can drop below −20 °C with wind chill factors below −30 °C. The months July through September offer the most favorable weather for climbing The Spearhead.

See also

 List of mountains of Canada
 Geography of British Columbia
 Geology of British Columbia

References

"The Spearhead" in the Canadian Mountain Encyclopedia

External links
 Weather: Mountain Forecast

Two-thousanders of British Columbia
Garibaldi Ranges
Whistler, British Columbia
New Westminster Land District